The men's team competition of the table tennis event at the 2015 Southeast Asian Games will be held from 6 to 8 June at the Singapore Indoor Stadium in Singapore.

Schedule

Results

Preliminary round

Group A

Group B

Knockout round

Semifinals

Gold medal match

References

External links
 

Men's team